Ishizuka Eizō (石塚 英蔵, 31 October, 1866 – 28 July, 1942) was the 13th Governor-General of Taiwan (1929–1931). He was a graduate of the University of Tokyo.

References

External links 
 List of colonial governors in 1930

1866 births
1942 deaths
Governors-General of Taiwan
Recipients of the Order of the Rising Sun with Paulownia Flowers
University of Tokyo alumni
Politicians from Fukushima Prefecture